AbMAN (Aberdeen Metropolitan Area Network) was one of the regional networks that comprise JANET. AbMAN connected universities and colleges in and around Aberdeen in Scotland to one another and to the Janet backbone.

The AbMAN POPs were replaced by Janet managed POPs in mid 2010.

External links
 Janet

Regional academic computer networks in the United Kingdom
Education in Aberdeen
Higher education in Scotland
Internet in Scotland